Common names: Nikolsky's adder, forest-steppe adder.

Vipera nikolskii is a venomous viper species endemic to Ukraine, eastern Romania, and southwestern Russia. No subspecies are currently recognized.

Etymology
The specific name, nikolskii, is in honor of Russian herpetologist Alexander Mikhailovich Nikolsky.

Description

Holotype: ZDKU 14704, according to Golay et al. (1993).

Geographic range
Vipera nikolskii is found in Central Ukraine and southwestern Russia. Mallow et al. (2003) mention that the distribution is concentrated in the forest-steppe zone of the Kharkiv region in Ukraine.

The type locality, according to Golay et al. (1993), is the banks of the Uda River, between Besljudovka and Vasishtshevo, near Kharkiv.

Also, Vipera nikolskii was recently found in the eastern and southern part of Romania and Basarabia (Republic of Moldova) by Zinenko et al. (2010) and Strugariu & Zamfirescu (2008).It recently occurred on a ridge in the Low Tatras, Slovakia

References

Further reading

Golay P, Smith HM, Broadley DG, Dixon JR, McCarthy CJ, Rage J-C, Schätti B, Toriba M (1993). Endoglyphs and Other Major Venomous Snakes of the World. A Checklist. Geneva: Azemiops. 478 pp.
Strugariu A, Zamfirescu SR, Nicoarǎ A, Gherghel I, Sas I, Puşcaşu CM, Bugeac T (2008). "Preliminary data regarding the distribution of the herpetofauna in Iaşi County (Romania)". North-Western Journal of Zoology 4 (Supplement 1): S1-S23.
Vedmederja VI, Grubant VN, Rudajewa AV (1986). ["On the taxonomy of the three viper species in the Vipera kaznakowi complex"]. In: Ananjeva N, Borkin L (editors). "Systematics and Ecology of Amphibians and Reptiles". Proceedings of the Zoological Institute, Leningrad 157: 55-61. (In Russian).
Zinenko, Oleksandr; Ţurcanu, Vladimir; Strugariu, Alexandru (2010). "Distribution and morphological variation of Vipera berus nikolskii Vedmederja, Grubant et Rudaeva, 1986 in Western Ukraine, The Republic of Moldova and Romania". Amphibia - Reptilia 31 (1): 51-67.

External links

 

nikolskii
Reptiles of Europe
Reptiles described in 1986
Reptiles of Russia